Tomašnica is a small village in the Republic of Croatia, in Karlovac County. It is located on the left bank of the Dobra river in region called Gornje (Upper) Pokuplje, ten kilometres from Karlovac in the direction of Netretić. It belongs to municipality of Ozalj; population 158 (census 2011).

Characteristics

Tomašnica is place of beautiful nature (hills, forests, vineyards, creeks and springs) and hospitable people. Tomašnica suffered a lot in World War II when 41 men died in war. Tomašnica is connected with village Zadobarje by a wooden bridge and children go to school in Zadobarje. People in Croatia and around Netretić are often called Brajci. In Tomašnica and that region of Croatia people talk with mixture of all three Croatian dialects and this mixed dialect is called brajski govor or govor ozaljskog književnog kruga. Many Tomaščani (people from Tomašnica) today live in Australia, Canada and some other countries in the world. They come back to Croatia during the summer to visit its fatherland.

References

Populated places in Karlovac County